Akhiok (  in Alutiiq) is a second-class city in Kodiak Island Borough, Alaska, United States. Akhiok is Kodiak's southernmost village. The population was 63 at the 2020 census. Akhiok, which does not have a post office, is a rural location in postal code 99615 that belongs to Kodiak. The village is sometimes called Alitak, after a nearby bay.

Location and climate
Akhiok is located at 56.945560° North, 154.17028° West (Sec. 28, T037S, R031W, Seward Meridian). Akhiok is in the Kodiak Recording District, and the 3rd Judicial District.

Akhiok is located at the southern end of Kodiak Island at Alitak Bay.

The climate of the Kodiak Islands is dominated by a strong marine influence. There is little or no freezing weather, moderate precipitation, and frequent cloud cover and fog. Severe storms are common from December through February.

History and culture
Akhiok is an Alutiiq village dependent upon fishing and subsistence activities. The original village of Kashukugniut was occupied by Russians in the early 19th century. The community was originally a sea otter hunting settlement, located at Humpy Cove. The name Akhiok was reported in the 1880 census. In 1881, residents relocated to the present site at Alitak Bay. The relocation was, in part, based on the switch to a fishing economy. Most families gain their livelihood from fishing, either directly by fishing for salmon and halibut or by working in a nearby cannery. The community's Russian Orthodox church, Protection of the Theotokos Chapel, was built around 1900 at the site of an earlier structure. A post office was established in 1933. Residents of nearby Kaguyak relocated to Akhiok after the 1964 earthquake and tsunami destroyed their village. The city was incorporated in 1972.

Demographics

Akhiok first appeared on the 1880 U.S. Census as an unincorporated native village, all 114 residents were Inuit. It was returned as Alitak in 1890 (accounting for the dramatic increase in population, it included the village of Akhiok and those working in the cannery at Olga Bay). It did not appear on the 1900 census. It appeared as Akhiok (or alternatively as Achiok) on the 1910 and 1920 census. In 1930, it was returned as "Alltak" (likely an erroneous spelling). In 1940, it reported as Alitak again. From 1950 to date (2010), it has returned as Akhiok, incorporating in 1972.

As of the census of 2000, there were 80 people, 25 households, and 17 families residing in the city. The population density was 10.1 people per square mile (3.9/km). There were 34 housing units at an average density of 4.3 per square mile (1.7/km). The racial makeup of the city was 2.50% White, 86.25% Native American, 3.75% Asian, and 7.50% from two or more races. 1.25% of the population were Hispanic or Latino of any race.

There were 25 households, out of which 36.0% had children under the age of 18 living with them, 36.0% were married couples living together, 20.0% had a female householder with no husband present, and 32.0% were non-families. 28.0% of all households were made up of individuals, and 4.0% had someone living alone who was 65 years of age or older. The average household size was 3.20 and the average family size was 3.94.

In the city, the age distribution of the population shows 35.0% under the age of 18, 17.5% from 18 to 24, 26.3% from 25 to 44, 16.3% from 45 to 64, and 5.0% who were 65 years of age or older. The median age was 24 years. For every 100 females, there were 122.2 males. For every 100 females age 18 and over, there were 108.0 males.

The median income for a household in the city was $33,438, and the median income for a family was $37,813. Males had a median income of $25,417 versus $6,250 for females. The per capita income for the city was $8,473. There were 5.3% of families and 9.9% of the population living below the poverty line, including 12.5% of under eighteens and none of those over 64.

Public services
Water is derived from a dam and reservoir on a small stream, is treated and stored. Akhiok provides a piped gravity water and sewer system that serves all 25 homes in the community. A new water source is needed. A new landfill site is under development. Electricity is provided by City of Akhiok.

There is one school in the community, Akhiok School of the Kodiak Island Borough School District, attended by 16 students.

Local hospitals or health clinics include Akhiok Medical Clinic (907-836-2230). Akhiok Medical Clinic is a Primary Health Care Facility. Akhiok is classified as an isolated village. It is found in EMS Region 2G in the Kodiak Region. Emergency Services have coastal and air access. Emergency service is provided by volunteers and a health aide. Auxiliary health care is provided by Akhiok Village Response Team (Clinic 907-836-2230); flight to Kodiak or Anchorage.

Economy and transportation
Public sector employment and seasonal work provide cash flow in the community. Five residents hold commercial fishing permits. Almost all of Akhiok's residents depend heavily on subsistence fishing and hunting. Salmon, crab, shrimp, clams, ducks, seal, deer, rabbit and bear are utilized. The community is interested in developing a fish smokery and cold storage facility. Since January 2003, each Akhiok shareholder received $200,000 from sales of a $36 million trust fund provided in the Exxon Valdez oil spill settlement.

The city is accessible only by air and water. Island Air Service offers regular passenger service. In addition, Regular and charter flights are available from the city of Kodiak. Barge services are sporadic. A breakwater and boat launch are available, but the existing dock is a temporary structure.

Taxes: Sales: None, Property: 9.25 mills (Borough), Special: 5% Accommodations Tax (Borough); 0.925% Severance Tax (Borough)

Additional Akhiok information
The members of the community are used as an example in the book Elementary Statistics for College Students (6th Edition, 2004) by Allen R. Angel. The information includes photographs of some residents.

References

External links

 Akhiok at the Community Database Online from the Alaska Division of Community and Regional Affairs
 Maps from the Alaska Department of Labor and Workforce Development: 2000, 2010
 Akhiok/Kodiak Island 
 Photographs of the community 

Cities in Alaska
Cities in Kodiak Island Borough, Alaska
Populated coastal places in Alaska on the Pacific Ocean
Road-inaccessible communities of Alaska